Terry Poole may refer to:

Terry Poole (American football), American football offensive tackle
Terry Poole (footballer, born 1937), English footballer
Terry Poole (footballer, born 1949), English footballer